Gertrude Pierrepont, Countess of Kingston-upon-Hull (29 September 1580 – 1649), born Gertrude Talbot, was an English noblewoman and peeress, the wife of Robert Pierrepont, 1st Earl of Kingston-upon-Hull, and the daughter of the Honourable Henry Talbot, and his wife, the former Elizabeth Reyner. 

Henry Talbot was a younger son of George Talbot, 6th Earl of Shrewsbury, and Gertrude was his elder daughter and co-heir. She married Pierrepont at Kinwalton Church, on 8 January 1601, and he was created a Viscount in 1627, and an Earl in 1628.

Their children included:
Henry Pierrepont, 1st Marquess of Dorchester (1606–1680), who married, first, Cecilia Bayning, by whom he had children, and secondly, Lady Catherine Stanley
Francis Pierrepont (died 1658 or 1659), who married Elizabeth Bray and had children
William Pierrepont (1607/8–1679), who married Elizabeth Harries and had children
Gervas Pierrepont (named as responsible for her monument), who died unmarried
Lady Elizabeth Pierrepont, who died unmarried
Lady Frances Pierrepont (born 1615), who married Philip Rolleston and had children 
George Pierrepont, who married and had children
Mary, who died in infancy

The Earl of Kingston was killed by friendly fire in 1643, while fighting for King Charles I of England in the English Civil War. The couple's eldest son, Henry, was created a Marquess in 1645. The Countess died, aged 68, and a memorial was erected by her son at St Edmund's Church, Holme Pierrepont, near the family seat; it describes her as "replete with all the qualities that adorn her sex; and more eminent in them than in the greatness of her birth...."

References

1580 births
1649 deaths
English countesses